Triantha is a small genus of flowering plants in the family Tofieldiaceae, first described as a genus in 1879. False asphodel is a common name for plants in this genus.

Triantha has four known species. One of these is endemic to Japan. The other three are native to North America.

A comparison of DNA sequences has indicated that Triantha glutinosa might be two species.

Before the family Tofieldiaceae was established in 1995, Triantha and related genera were usually placed in Nartheciaceae, Liliaceae, or Melanthiaceae, but molecular phylogenetic studies of monocots and Alismatales have shown that inclusion of Triantha etc. in these families makes them polyphyletic.

Some authors have included Triantha within the genus Tofieldia. Triantha is distinguished from Tofieldia by its glandular-pubescent stems and by the presence of seed appendages. In 2011, a study of two nuclear genes and ten chloroplast genes showed that Triantha and Tofieldia are monophyletic and closely related sister clades. The species of Triantha are so closely related that the authors could not resolve any relationships among them.

It was reported in August 2021 that the species Triantha occidentalis is carnivorous, catching insects with sticky hairs and enzymatic secretions on its stem.

Species
 Triantha glutinosa (Michx.) Baker - sticky asphodel - Canada, Alaska, Great Lakes region, Maine, scattered other spots in USA
 Triantha japonica (Miq.) Baker  - Honshu
 Triantha occidentalis (S.Wats.) R.R.Gates-western false asphodel - Western Canada (Alb, BC), western United States (AK WA OR CA ID MT WY)
 Triantha racemosa (Walter) Small-coastal false asphodel - Coastal Plain of United States from TX to NJ

References

External links
Flora of North America

Tofieldiaceae
Taxa named by John Gilbert Baker
Taxa named by Thomas Nuttall